Homebase is a novel written by Shawn Wong, first published in 1979 by Bookpeople. It is currently published by the University of Washington Press in 2008 and was also published by Plume in 1991.

"Misty, poetic and often sensual, 'Homebase' is an evocative portrait of a young man caught between two cultures." said Charles Solomon in the Los Angeles Times.

References 

1979 American novels